"Broken Hearted Soul" is a single by Ra from the album Black Sun, released on Christmas Day of 2007. On the same day, it was available for a free download on Ra's Myspace for only 24 hours. The single was available on iTunes as of June 17, 2008. "Broken Hearted Soul" received a double feature on the iTunes rock homepage and downloaded 8,000 singles by album launch. It also reached #2 on Heatseekers National chart, and #38 on R&R Active Rock.

Sahaj said: "'Broken Hearted Soul' is one of the best songs I have ever written".

Notes
In an interview with Antimusic, Sahaj Ticotin talked about "Broken Hearted Soul":

"Doing the new Ra record was all about simplifying and thickening what we'd already done on "From one" and "Duality". When it came time to start the record I immediately came up with the riff for "Broken Hearted Soul". Being half Puerto Rican but being in a band named after an Egyptian god, I wanted to do something with a bit of Latin flavor and this pseudo flamenco line is what came up. Then I thought of playing it acoustically for an intro. The groove was funky so I figured why not make the track bounce with the drums.

As for the rest of it... I've been working with all these new emo type bands and I think it rubbed off on me a little for the pre chorus and choruses. I love this song. Lyrically it came directly out of my relationship experience and quoted verbatim several things I actually lamented. The thing I was most proud of with the track was the feeling that there really wasn't anything like it on the radio so I felt very successful having created something unique in a market flooded with similar music."

Reception
Billboard said: "Rock stations aren't the only ones totally asleep on the wheel on this one. 'Broken Hearted Soul' should be spinning alongside Daughtry, Hinder, and Nickelback at top 40."

TuneLabMusic said: "'Broken Hearted Soul' busts out in a frolic, setting a happy-go-lucky vibe that Ra needed to prove they have been able to slay the wraiths of the past and move forward triumphantly. As the leadoff batter and first piece of radio matter from 'Black Sun', the consistent oomph of 'Broken Hearted Soul' proves clutch."

WGLI-FM the Rockin' Eagle' said: "This song is also kind of one of a kind, I like how the band mixes it up with it being slow at first then hitting it hard during the verses and the chorus."

Charts

References

Melodic.net information

Ra (American band) songs
2008 singles
2008 songs
Songs written by Sahaj (musician)